A windsport is any type of sport which involves wind-power, often involving a non-rigid airfoil such as a sail or a power kite. The activities can be land-based, on snow, on ice or on water. Windsport activity may be regulated in some countries by aviation/maritime authorities if they are likely to interfere with other activities. Local authorities may also regulate activity in certain areas, especially on crowded beaches and parks.

Ice boating - using a masted sail attached to a vessel with skates
Kite boating - sailing a boat in displacement or planing mode using a kite
Kite landboarding - using a power kite with a wheeled board while standing
Kite buggy - using a wheeled buggy with seats attached to a power kite
Kite flying - flight of a small airfoil by a standing ground operator using 1-4 flying lines
Kite jumping - brief acrobatic flight using a large kite
Kite skating - as for kite jumping but while using specialized skates
Kite surfing - using a surfboard attached to a power kite
Land sailing - a masted sail attached to a land vehicle - see also land yacht
Sailing - navigating a boat with sail attached to a mast
Snowkiting - skiing/snowboarding under the power of a kite
Windsurfing - sailing using a masted sail attached via a gimbal to a surfboard
Sail biking - using a power kite to pull a specialized bicycle (like land sailing)

Air sports
The following air sports are not classed as windsports because in these the participants actually leave the ground for long periods and many do not use the wind:
Gliding - use of vertically moving air to keep an aircraft aloft
Hang gliding - use of vertically moving air to keep aloft an aircraft with a flexible wing
Microlighting - flying a hang glider with an engine (also see ultralight aircraft)
Parachuting (skydiving) and base jumping - controlled descent of the operator under a large flexible canopy
Paragliding - soaring under a parachute canopy
Parasailing - hanging under a paraglider towed by a vehicle (boat, car, or snowmobile) in order to ascend (usually over water)
Air Ballooning - a balloon you ride which uses fire to go up and wind to stay afloat
Paramotoring - a motor vehicle attached with a parachute which can hang into the air for hours and can also be used as a vehicle to cross countries or jumping to an island. It is self-controllable, and you may need the permission of the local government to fly over an area.

External links
 KiteSurf Varna Links Directory The large links directory with thousands of photos and videos, all about Kite Surfing.

Air sports

de:Luftsport